Chilbolton is a village and civil parish in Hampshire, England, near to Stockbridge. Its most notable feature is the Chilbolton Observatory situated on the disused RAF Chilbolton airfield. The parish church of St Mary the Less dates back to the 12th century, on the site of an earlier wooden church. The River Test runs through Chilbolton Common.

Chilbolton is recorded in the Domesday Book under the name Cilbodentune.

See also 
 Chilbolton Observatory

References

External links 

Chilbolton and Wherwell Website
ANY-village for Chilbolton
Publications featuring Chilbolton
The Abbots Mitre Chilbolton and Cottonworth Trail

Villages in Hampshire
Test Valley